William Vane, 1st Viscount Vane (1682 – 20 May 1734), of Fairlawn, Kent, was a British Whig politician who sat in the House of Commons between 1708 and 1734.

Early life
Vane was baptized on 17 February 1682, the second surviving son of Christopher Vane, 1st Baron Barnard and Lady Elizabeth Holles. His father inherited Raby Castle, Durham and Fairlawne, Kent in 1662.

His paternal grandfather was Henry Vane the Younger who was beheaded at Tower Hill in 1662. His mother was a daughter of Gilbert Holles, 3rd Earl of Clare and the sister of John Holles, 1st Duke of Newcastle. He inherited a substantial fortune from his mother's family.

Career
At the 1708 British general election, Vane was returned unopposed as Member of Parliament for County Durham on his father's interest. He was active as a teller for various electoral disputes and voted for the naturalization of the Palatines, and for the impeachment of Dr Sacheverell. At the 1710 British general election, his father decided to drop him, so he did not stand.

In 1720 Vane was raised to the Peerage of Ireland as Baron Vane, of Dungannon in the County of Tyrone, and Viscount Vane. These titles did not disqualify him from sitting in the House of Commons. He succeeded his father in 1723.

At the 1727 British general election Vane was successfully returned in a contest for Steyning.  At the  1734 British general election he was defeated at Steyning but returned in a contest as MP for Kent. However, he died suddenly only five days later.

Personal life
In 1703, he married Lucy Jolliffe, daughter of Sir William Jolliffe, of Caverswall Castle, Staffordshire. The settlement  dated 15 November 1703   included Fairlawn, Kent, and lands in Durham, providing Vane with £600 p.a. for himself and his wife. After the marriage, Vane's father refused to include Fairlawn in the settlement, and took ‘great displeasure’ and stopped the allowance when his son took legal advice. The  case came before the House of Lords and the settlement was confirmed. Vane kept possession of Fairlawn. Together, they were the parents of:

 Christopher Vane, who predeceased Lord Vane.
 John Vane, who predeceased Lord Vane.
 William Vane, 2nd Viscount Vane (1714–1789), who married Frances, Lady William Hamilton who was previously married to the 4th Duke of Hamilton's second son, Lord William Hamilton.

Vane died of apoplexy on 20 May 1734 at Fairlawn, Shipbourne, Kent, where he was buried on 5 June.  He was succeeded in the viscountcy by his only surviving son, William. Lady Vane died in March 1742.

References

1682 births
1734 deaths
Members of the Parliament of Great Britain for English constituencies
British MPs 1708–1710
British MPs 1727–1734
British MPs 1734–1741
Viscounts in the Peerage of Ireland
Peers of Ireland created by George I
Younger sons of barons
William